Thangal Kunju Musaliar Institute of Technology ( TKM Institute of Technology) (Malayalam: തങ്ങള്‍ കുഞ്ഞു മുസല്യാര്‍ സാങ്കേതിക വിദ്യാപീഠം) (Hindi:थंगल कुंजू मुसलिअर प्रोद्योगिकी संस्थान) is an institute of engineering and technology located in Karuvelil, 23 km from the city of Kollam, Kerala, India. Earlier the institute was affiliated by Cochin University of Science and Technology(CUSAT). Now the institute is affiliated by APJ Abdul Kalam Technological University (KTU).

Overview
TKM Institute of Technology is affiliated to the APJ Abdul Kalam Technological University and All India Council of Technical Education. The institute offers undergraduate and Postgraduate courses in various streams of engineering. It is close to the technology and industrial campus of Technopark, Kollam.

History
TKM Institute of Technology was started functioning in the year 2002. The college was established by the TKM College Trust with the approval of the AICTE and affiliation of APJ Abdul Kalam Technological University.

The TKM College Trust was registered as an educational trust on 20 December 1956, by Thangal Kunju Musaliar, an eminent educationalist and the doyen of the cashew industry.

Admission
The admission procedure and the fee structure is decided by the Government of Kerala. A certain percentage of seats are reserved for the children of non-resident Indians (NRIs).

Departments
 Dept of Biomedical Engineering
 Dept of Civil Engineering
 Dept of Mechanical Engineering 
 Dept of Computer Science Engineering
 Dept of Food Technology
 Dept of Electrical and Electronics Engineering

References

http://www.highereducationinindia.com/institutes/tkm-institute-of-technology-32.php - TKMIT

External links
 TKM institute of Technology, Computer Science Department National Conference website
 Study Guide India

Engineering colleges in Kollam district